The MG Q-type (sometimes referred to as the MG QA) is a racing car that was produced by MG in 1934. The chassis was based on the one used on the MG K3 but was narrower and used N-type axles. A high-pressure Zoller supercharger was fitted giving a boost to 2.5 atmospheres (1.8 kg/cc) and allowing the engine to produce  at 7200 rpm.

Probably only eight were made (Michael Sedgwick states nine) as the car was expensive at £550–£650, and the rigid-axle chassis had difficulty in dealing with the power of the engine.

References 

Q-type
Q-type
Cars introduced in 1934